Newland may refer to:


Places

Australia
 Electoral district of Newland, a state electoral district in South Australia
Hundred of Newland, a cadastral unit on Kangaroo Island in South Australia
Newland, South Australia, a locality in the Kangaroo Island Council
Newland Head Conservation Park, a protected area in South Australia
Lake Newland Conservation Park, South Australia

United Kingdom
 Newland, Cumbria
 Newland, Eastrington, East Riding of Yorkshire
 Newland, Kingston upon Hull, East Riding of Yorkshire
 Newland, Gloucestershire
 Newland, North Yorkshire
 Newland, Worcestershire
 Newland Park, Chalfont St Peter, Buckinghamshire
 Newland with Woodhouse Moor, West Yorkshire

United States
 Newland, Indiana
 Newland, North Carolina

Other uses
 Newland (surname), including a list of people with the name

See also
 Newlands (disambiguation)
 New Land (disambiguation)
New states (disambiguation)
New Country (disambiguation)